Julie Martine Thibaud (born 20 April 1998) is a French professional footballer who plays as a defender for Division 1 Féminine club Bordeaux and the France national team.

Career 
Thibaud started playing football at a tiny club called AS Échiré Saint-Gelais in Saint-Gelais, but she had to move aged 15, as her club did not have any women's team and she had been playing with the boys until then. She then joined ASJ Soyaux, before going to the FC Girondins de Bordeaux in 2017.

Thibaud was called up to the France national team for the first time by Corinne Diacre on 10 September 2020.

Honours

International
UEFA Women's Under-19 Championship: 2016

References

External links
 
 
 

1998 births
France women's international footballers
French women's footballers
France women's youth international footballers
Living people
People from Niort
Women's association football midfielders
Division 1 Féminine players
FC Girondins de Bordeaux (women) players
Sportspeople from Deux-Sèvres
Footballers from Nouvelle-Aquitaine